The Roots Reggae Library is a website that lists reviews of discographies of reggae artists. It contains detailed written descriptions of albums, songs and the style of the artist. There are currently 33 discographies on the website. The content of the website consists of information on a large range of albums within the reggae genre, some of which are extremely rare and hard to get elsewhere. A number of artists discographies are uniquely indexed and/or newly created. Songs with lyrics other than English are interpreted in English. This is done in collaboration with various people around the world.

History
The Roots Reggae Library was started in May 2012 as an initiative to index, store and analyse reggae music, with a particular emphasis on the transition period of rocksteady into roots reggae. Although the first edition published in May 2012 focused on Bob Marley, the author communicated his intent to dedicate special attention to other musicians besides “the King of Reggae”. The primary focus of the Roots Reggae Library is to create a single library of both Jamaican and non-Jamaican reggae music.

The initial name of the website was This Is Crucial Reggae. It was changed to Roots Reggae Library in order to prevent confusion with the This Is Crucial Reggae series that features best of albums of reggae artists.

Content

The slogan of the Roots Reggae Library is "read, listen, collect". The website provides descriptions and reviews of albums, as well as individual songs. The library is a growing collection of reggae music, including descriptions of rare albums and artists. In recent times it has aimed to add hard to find African reggae records.

The Roots Reggae Library brings forth a unique index of the music from The Wailers, drawn from the period prior to their signing to Island Records and the release of Catch a Fire. The music of The Wailers has been categorized into 17 albums, of which 6 are predominantly from the 1963–1967 ska period and 11 from the 1968–1972 rocksteady period. In a similar fashion, the singles recorded by The Tartans are compiled into two albums. The library has compiled three albums of the Twinkle Brothers with songs not previously released on albums. Two albums of The Congos featuring various other artists were indexed. There are also two Steel Pulse albums made, of which one is an album with collaborations with other artists, similar to those albums described by The Congos. Single new albums of Ijahman Levi, Judy Mowatt, The Abyssinians, The Gladiators and Talisman can be found. These albums vary in time frame, whereas some are collections of recently released singles, others go further back in time to include singles that were not released on any album.

Besides those mentioned above, other editions have featured well known artists such as Peter Tosh and Bunny Wailer. The list of Jamaican artists on the website is long, including musicians such as Ijahman Levi, Prince Lincoln, The Congos, The Gladiators, the Twinkle Brothers, Israel Vibration, The Abyssinians and Judy Mowatt, the only female artist. There are various artists from other Caribbean islands, Africa, and artists from elsewhere with African or Caribbean roots.

The discographies described on the website are generally the original albums released by the artists, with the addition of singles and outtakes. This has been done in an attempt to create a full index of the discography of each artist and to describe everything an artist has ever released in studio.

YouTube
The YouTube Channel of This Is Crucial Reggae was initiated in October 2012. Although far from representing the current YouTube channel of the Roots Reggae Library, it provided a fundamental step to create the current concept. Initially all library's music was available on YouTube in order for people to listen to what had been reviewed on the Roots Reggae Library website. However, the author announced in December 2015 that albums will no longer be uploaded in order to refrain from breaking copyright regulations. Instead the channel will host a single video per artist or group to account for their discography, highlighting extras and rarities.

Index

-* Playing time excluding 'Ngikwethembe Na', which is at the top of the Roots Reggae Library wishlist

References

 
Dutch music websites
Dutch digital libraries